Dharmpura or Dharampura is a village in the Indian state of Bihar. It is located in Deo block in the district of Aurangabad.

References

Villages in Aurangabad district, Bihar